Mpraeso Amanfrom is a town in the Kwahu West Municipal District of the Eastern Region of Ghana. The population is about 2,000 people, mostly Kwahus. Main occupations include farming and making pottery.

References 

Populated places in the Eastern Region (Ghana)